2009–10 in Kenyan football may refer to:
2009 in Kenyan football
2010 in Kenyan football